Kask or KASK may refer to:

Kask (surname)
Kask, Kerman, a village in Kerman Province, Iran
Kask, Zanjan, a village in Zanjan Province, Iran
Asta Kask, a punk band from Töreboda, Sweden
KASK, an American radio station

See also
 Cask (disambiguation)
 KASC (disambiguation)
 Karsk